Cho Min-Woo (趙民宇, born May 13, 1992) is a South Korean football player who currently plays for Pohang Steelers in K League Classic.

Club statistics
Updated to 23 February 2016.

References

External links

 
 Profile at V-Varen Nagasaki

1992 births
Living people
Association football central defenders
South Korean footballers
South Korean expatriate footballers
South Korean expatriate sportspeople in Japan
Expatriate footballers in Japan
FC Seoul players
Gangwon FC players
V-Varen Nagasaki players
K League 1 players
K League 2 players
J2 League players
Dongguk University alumni
People from Seongnam
Sportspeople from Gyeonggi Province